NITW may refer to:
Night in the Woods, a video game
National Institute of Technology, Warangal, a public technological university in Warangal, India